The 2011 Pan American Men's Junior Handball Championship took place in Brasília from April 17 – April 21. It acts as the American qualifying tournament for the 2011 Men's Junior World Handball Championship.

Results

Final standing

2011 in handball
Pan American Men's Junior Handball Championship